8 is an anthology film consisting of eight short films centred on the eight Millennium Development Goals.

Topics 
Eight directors had "carte blanche" to treat one of the eight topics:
Segment by Abderrahmane Sissako: Tiya's Dream (Eradicate extreme poverty and hunger)
Segment by Gael García Bernal: The Letter (Achieve universal primary education)
Segment by Mira Nair: How Can It Be? (Promote gender equality and empower women)
Segment by Gus Van Sant: Mansion on the Hill (Reduce child mortality rate)
Segment by Jan Kounen: The Story of Panshin Beka (Improve maternal health)
Segment by Gaspar Noé: SIDA (Combat HIV/AIDS, malaria, and other diseases)
Segment by Jane Campion: The Water Diary (Ensure environmental sustainability)
Segment by Wim Wenders: Person to Person (Develop a global partnership for development)

References

External links

 Watch on YouTube 

2008 films
2000s English-language films
2000s French-language films
Films directed by Abderrahmane Sissako
Films directed by Gaspar Noé
Films directed by Gus Van Sant
Films directed by Jan Kounen
Films directed by Jane Campion
Films directed by Mira Nair
Films directed by Wim Wenders
French anthology films
2008 multilingual films
2000s French films